Eroles is a locality located in the municipality of Tremp, in Province of Lleida province, Catalonia, Spain. As of 2020, it has a population of 16.

Geography 
Eroles is located 108km north-northeast of Lleida.

References

Populated places in the Province of Lleida